The 2018 TCR China season was the second season of the TCR's Chinese Touring Car Championship.

Teams and drivers

Calendar and results
The 2018 schedule was announced on 18 December 2017, with six events scheduled.

Championship standings

Drivers' championship

References

External links
TCR China Series Official website

TCR China Series
TCR China Series
China Series